Peter Bowen was an American writer born May 22, 1945, and died April 8, 2020.

He lived in Livingston, Montana and had worked as a cowboy, hunting and fishing guide, folksinger, poet, essayist, and novelist.  He was the author of the Yellowstone Kelly historical novels as well as the Gabriel Du Pré mysteries. He also wrote humor and hunting articles under the pseudonym "Coyote Jack" for Forbes FYI magazine.

Works

Yellowstone Kelly novels

 Yellowstone Kelly: Gentleman and Scout, 1987
 Kelly Blue, 1991
 Imperial Kelly, 1992
 Kelly and the Three-toed Horse, 2001

Gabriel Du Pré mysteries
 Coyote Wind, 1994
 Specimen Song, 1995
 Wolf, No Wolf, 1996
 Notches, 1997
 Thunder Horse, 1998
 Long Son, 1999
 The Stick Game, 2000
 Cruzatte and Maria, 2001
 Ash Child, 2002
 Badlands, 2003
 The Tumbler, 2004
 Stewball, 2005
 Nails, 2006
 Bitter Creek, 2015
 Solus, 2018

References

External links
 https://web.archive.org/web/20080530171042/http://us.macmillan.com/Author/peterbowen
  
 http://www.bozemannet.com/livingston_montana/writers.php
 Peter Bowen Papers (University of Montana Archives)

1945 births
Living people
Writers from Montana
American male novelists
People from Livingston, Montana
American historical novelists
American mystery novelists
20th-century American novelists
20th-century American male writers
21st-century American novelists
21st-century American male writers
University of Michigan alumni